Heinrich Weber may refer to:
Heinrich Friedrich Weber (1843–1912), German physicist
Heinrich Martin Weber (1842–1913), German mathematician
Ernst Heinrich Weber (1795-1878), German physician and psychologist
Heinrich Emil Weber, Swiss mathematician, one of the designers of the NEMA encryption system
Heinrich Weber (footballer) (1900–1977), German international footballer
Heini Weber (1923-2010), German Olympic wrestler